Shish kebab is a popular meal of skewered and grilled cubes of meat. It can be found in Mediterranean cuisine and is similar to or synonymous with dishes called shashlik and khorovats, found in the Caucasus region.

It is one of the many types of kebab, a range of meat dishes originating in the Middle East. In North American English, the word kebab alone often refers to shish kebab, though outside of North America, kebab may also mean doner kebab.

It is traditionally made of lamb but there are also versions with various kinds of meat, poultry, or fish. In Turkey, shish kebab and the vegetables served with it are grilled separately, normally not on the same skewer.

Etymology

According to the Oxford English Dictionary, its earliest known publication in English is in the 1914 novel Our Mr. Wrenn by Sinclair Lewis.

Etymologist Sevan Nişanyan states that the word has the equivalent meaning of "frying/burning" with "kabābu" in the old Akkadian language, and "kbabā/כבבא" in Aramaic.

Gallery

See also

 Arrosticini
 Souvlaki
 List of kebabs
 List of meat dishes
 Satay

References

Iranian cuisine
Levantine cuisine
Ottoman cuisine
Skewered kebabs
Turkish cuisine
Meat dishes
Israeli cuisine
Jordanian cuisine
Iraqi cuisine
Syrian cuisine
Palestinian cuisine
Lebanese cuisine
Egyptian cuisine